Kalina Jędrusik (5 February 1930 in Częstochowa – 7 August 1991 in Warsaw) was a Polish singer and actress. She performed in more than thirty films from 1953 to 1991. Jędrusik was married to writer Stanisław Dygat.

Biography 
Kalina Jędrusik was born in 1930 in Gnaszyn, now part of Częstochowa, as a daughter of Henryk Jędrusik, a member of the Senate of Poland. She graduated from Juliusz Słowacki Public High School in 1949 in her birth town. In 1949 she moved to Kraków, where she graduated from Ludwik Solski Academy for the Dramatic Arts. Kalina Jędrusik debuted in 1953 at the Wybrzeże Theatre in Gdańsk. From 1955 she performed at several Warsaw theaters, including the National Theatre (1955-1957), Współczesny Theatre (1957-1963), Comedy Theatre (1964-1967), Studencki Teatr Satyryków (1969-1972), Variety Theatre (1972-1985), and the Polish Theatre (1985-1991).

She was also famous for performing in the Elderly Gentlemen's Cabaret and acting in many Polish movies, including Lekarstwo na miłość or Ziemia obiecana.

In the 1960s and the 1970s, Jędrusik was a Polish sex symbol. In 1976 she performed in the United States with Violetta Villas.

She died in Warsaw on 7 August 1991 from an asthma attack. and was buried at the Avenue of Notables at Powązki Cemetery.

In 1996, she was voted the third greatest Polish film actress in a poll conducted by the Film magazine to celebrate 100 years of cinema.

In 2021, a biographical film Bo we mnie jest seks (Autumn Girl) directed by Katarzyna Klimkiewicz and starring Maria Dębska in the lead role as well as Borys Szyc, Leszek Lichota and Rafał Rutkowski was released.

Selected filmography

References

External links
 
 Profile on filmpolski.pl 
 
Kalina Jędrusik at culture.pl

1930 births
1991 deaths
Burials at Powązki Cemetery
Polish film actresses
Polish stage actresses
Polish television actresses
20th-century Polish actresses
People from Częstochowa
People from Kielce Voivodeship (1919–1939)